Jordahl is a Norwegian family name that could refer to:
Asbjørn Jordahl, a Norwegian politician for the Labour Party
Anders Jordahl, developer of the C-shaped rail, the first anchor channel
Russell N. Jordahl, Brigadier general in the Marine Corps
V. Trygve Jordahl, an Evangelical Lutheran Church (ELC) District President/Bishop, U.S. Army Chaplain, and Director of Service to Military Personnel (ELC)
a female character in the Magni (Marvel Comics), adapted from the original Magni series about Norse mythology by Dan Jurgens
an elementary school in Fountain, Colorado

See also
 Jordal - city near Oslo, Norway
 Jordalsgrenda